The 2013 Women's County One-Day Championship was the 17th cricket Women's County Championship season. It ran from April to September and saw 33 county teams and teams representing Ireland, Scotland, Wales and the Netherlands compete in a series of divisions. Sussex Women won the County Championship as winners of the top division, beating Yorkshire in the division final. The Championship was Sussex's sixth title.

Competition format 
Teams played matches within a series of divisions with the winners of the top division being crowned County Champions. Matches were played using a one day format with 50 overs per side.

The championship worked on a points system, with placings decided by average points of completed games. The top two in each division played in a final to determine the winner, subsequently followed by promotion play-offs. The points are awarded as follows:

Win: 10 points + bonus points. 
Tie:  5 points + bonus points. 
Loss: Bonus points.
Abandoned or cancelled: Match not counted to average.

Bonus points are awarded for various batting and bowling milestones. The bonus points for each match are retained if the match is completed.

Batting

1.50 runs per over (RPO) or more: 1 point
2 RPO or more: 2 points
3 RPO or more: 3 points
4 RPO or more: 4 points

Bowling

3-4 wickets taken: 1 point
5-6 wickets taken: 2 points
7-8 wickets taken: 3 points
9-10 wickets taken: 4 points

Teams
The 2013 Championship was divided into four divisions: Divisions One to Three with nine teams apiece and Division Four with two groups of five.

Teams in each group played each other once.

Division One

Table

Source: ECB Women's County Championship

Play-offs

Division Two

Table

Source: ECB Women's County Championship

Play-offs

Division Three

Table

Source: ECB Women's County Championship

Play-offs

Division Four

North & East 

Source: ECB Women's County Championship

South & West 

Source: ECB Women's County Championship

Play-off

Promotion play-offs 
The teams that won the Division Finals played against the team that lost the relegation play-off from the Division above for the chance of promotion.

Statistics

Most runs

Source: CricketArchive

Most wickets

Source: CricketArchive

References

 
2013
cricket
cricket
cricket